Mark Warnecke (born 15 February 1970 in Bochum, North Rhine-Westphalia) is a German former breaststroke swimmer who, at age 35, won the world title in the 50 m breaststroke at the 2005 World Aquatics Championships in Montreal. That made him the oldest swimming world champion since 1971. He started for the German swimming club SG Essen.

He competed in four consecutive Summer Olympics for his native country, starting in 1988 in Seoul, South Korea, where he was a member of the 4×100 m medley relay team, that finished in fourth position. Eight years later he won the bronze medal in the 100 m breaststroke, at the 1996 Summer Olympics in Atlanta, Georgia.

See also
 List of German records in swimming
 World record progression 50 metres breaststroke

References

External links
 Personal website
 

1970 births
Living people
Sportspeople from Bochum
German male swimmers
German male breaststroke swimmers
Olympic swimmers of Germany
Swimmers at the 1988 Summer Olympics
Swimmers at the 1992 Summer Olympics
Swimmers at the 1996 Summer Olympics
Swimmers at the 2000 Summer Olympics
Olympic bronze medalists for Germany
World record setters in swimming
Olympic bronze medalists in swimming
World Aquatics Championships medalists in swimming
German racing drivers
Porsche Supercup drivers
Medalists at the FINA World Swimming Championships (25 m)
European Aquatics Championships medalists in swimming
Medalists at the 1996 Summer Olympics
20th-century German people
21st-century German people

Engstler Motorsport drivers
Porsche Carrera Cup Germany drivers